The Carlo Cattaneo University (LIUC) is a proprietary, for-profit university located in Castellanza, Italy.

History and profile
It was founded in 1991, by around 300 entrepreneurs, as a joint venture between Italian corporations who provided the initial funding and continued to provide support and guidance under the seal of the Industrial Association of the Province of Varese (UNIVA). The university, housed in a restored nineteenth century cotton mill, is organized into three Faculties (Business & Economics, Business Law and Management Engineering). The university is named after Carlo Cattaneo, a nineteenth-century local thinker and economist.
Evolution of course offerings:
 In 1991, the university opened with an incoming class for the Bachelor of Business Administration (Economia Aziendale).
 In 1994, a diploma in Engineering Management was offered.
 In 1998, the bachelor's program in Business Law was introduced.

Campus

Cantoni Cotton mill 
LIUC is located within the historic structure of an industrial complex, the Cantoni cotton mill, born around 1830, and that later became full of industry.  The restoration and rehabilitation of the former spinning workshop were commissioned by the Union of Industrialists of the Province of Varese.

Campus today 
To date, the factory buildings have been the home to the University Campus. The covered area of the University is 68,000 square metres; classrooms with a total of 3,000 seats, a lecture hall of more than 300 seats, five workshops, a library of 1,600 square metres with 100,000 volumes and a rich collection of periodicals, an auditorium with 100 seats, a cafeteria dedicated to student activities, experiential workshops and home to various events.

Dormitories 
The Campus of LIUC also has a university residence, named after the Castellana industrialist, Luigi Pomini, with 440 beds and a total area of 10,800 square metres that accommodates both Italian and foreign students.

LIUC Park 
The university campus complex comprises also a green space: LIUC park, of 26,000 square metres, the location is utilized for conducting the annual Degree ceremony.

Programs

Faculty of Business & Economics

 Finance and Administration
 Communication, Marketing and New Media
 Sports Management 
 Management and entrepreneurship
 Business Economics (taught in English)
 Global Markets (taught in English)
 Family Business Management (taught in English)
 Administration and Audit 
 Bank, Markets and Finance 
 Economy and Business Management 
 Entrepreneurship & Innovation (taught in English)
 International Business Management (taught in English)
 Management of Human Resources - HR & Consulting 
 Marketing

Faculty of Engineering

 Systems and Services for Digital Business
 Industrial Operations Excellence (taught in Italian or English)
 Data Science for Operational Excellence 
 Digital Consulting 
 Health Care System Management 
 Manufacturing Strategy (taught in English)

Faculty of Law
 Laurea Magistrale in Giurisprudenza

Rankings and research
It is one of the three Italian Universities (together with SDA Bocconi and Università Cattolica) part of the Institute for Strategy and Competitiveness's network teaching Michael Porter's Microeconomics of Competitiveness graduate class. In 2015 the Italian economic newspaper Il Sole 24 Ore placed LIUC university as third best private economic school in Italy by didactics, and fifth taking into account also research.
However, the university is not ranked among "QS Top University"'s ranking

Library
Biblioteca Mario Rostoni was established in 1991 and is the academic library affiliated with “‘’University Carlo Cattaneo’’”. It counts as much as 110,000 volumes which comprise ebooks, paper books, magazines, financial statements, and databases of economy, management, law e engineering.

Student and alumni associations
Alumni - Students and researchers who attended at least 1-year at the University Carlo Cattaneo participate in the LIUC Alumni Association.
Leo Club - Is an extension of Lions International and it is composed by young people. The purpose is organize services to rise money for pro-bono causes.
ESN - Erasmus Student Network is a no-profit international student organisation. 
Junior Enterprise LIUC - Offers teams of students with the ability to perform management consulting projects for companies located in Italy and abroad.
ELSA - Is part of European Law Students' Association, the world's largest independent law students' association.

Notable Students

 Francesca Locatelli, Head of Global Service Italy, Greece and Turkey of Vodafone.
 Davide Riboni, President of Lavazza Professional NAAP, President Business Unit America e CEO Lavazza Premium Coffee.
 Luca Fachin, Chief Operating Officer of Deutsche Bank Italy.
 Alessio Agostinelli, Partner & Managing Director in Boston Consulting Group.
 Giovanni Ciferri, Co–Founder & CEO of Buddyfit

Notable faculty
Enrico Letta

See also 
 List of Italian universities

References

External links
 University Carlo Cattaneo Website
 University Carlo Cattaneo (Italian Wikipedia)
 LIUC Alumni

1991 establishments in Italy
Educational institutions established in 1991
For-profit universities and colleges in Europe
University Carlo Cattaneo
Universities in Italy